Damjan Sitar (born August 17, 1981 in Maribor) is a Slovenian decathlete. He set both a national record and a personal best score of 7,718 points, by winning his event at the 2008 Slovenian Open Athletics Championships, coincidentally in his home city.

Sitar represented Slovenia at the 2008 Summer Olympics in Beijing, where he competed in men's decathlon. During the event, he set a personal best of 47.23 metres in the javelin throw, but received poor scores in the shot put, discus throw, and pole vault, which cost him a chance for a medal. In the end, Sitar finished only in twenty-third place, with a total score of 7,336 points.

Personal bests

All information taken from IAAF profile.

References

External links

NBC Olympics Profile

Slovenian decathletes
Living people
Olympic athletes of Slovenia
Athletes (track and field) at the 2008 Summer Olympics
Sportspeople from Maribor
1981 births